Emamzadeh Pir Abu ol Hasan (also Romanized as Emāmzādeh Pīr Abū ol Ḩasan; also known as Emāmzādeh Abū ol Ḩasan, Pīr Abul Hasan, Pīr Abū ol Ḩasan, Shāhzādeh Abū ol Ḩasan, and Sheykh Abū ol Ḩasan) is a village in Dasht-e Barm Rural District, Kuhmareh District, Kazerun County, Fars Province, Iran. At the 2006 census, its population was 511, in 106 families.

References 

Populated places in Kazerun County